ISTS may refer to:

 Intel Science Talent Search, now Regeneron Science Talent Search
 International Society for Twin Studies, a nonprofit scientific organization
 "I Shot the Sheriff", a 1973 song by The Wailers, popularized by Eric Clapton

See also 
 IST (disambiguation)